The 2019 NHL Winter Classic (officially the 2019 Bridgestone NHL Winter Classic) was an outdoor ice hockey game played in the National Hockey League (NHL) on January 1, 2019, at Notre Dame Stadium in Notre Dame, Indiana. The 11th edition of the Winter Classic, the game matched the Chicago Blackhawks against the Boston Bruins; the Bruins won,  4–2. It was the fourth Winter Classic appearance for the Blackhawks (2009, 2015, 2017), their sixth outdoor game overall, and fifth outdoor game in six years. It was the third Winter Classic appearance for the Bruins (2010, 2016). The game was the Bruins' first Winter Classic as the visiting team, and the first time the NHL hosted an outdoor game outside a team's immediate media market (Chicago, the host team, is in an adjacent media market to the South Bend market where Notre Dame is located).

Game summary
The Boston Bruins won 4–2 with Tuukka Rask in goal, making 36 saves. The game was Rask's 469th for the Bruins, making him the most prolific goaltender in Bruins history. David Pastrňák, Patrice Bergeron, Sean Kuraly and Brad Marchand scored the goals for the Bruins. Brendan Perlini and Dominik Kahun scored the goals for the Blackhawks.

Number in parenthesis represents the player's total in goals or assists to that point of the season

Officials
Referees: Eric Furlatt, Francis Charron

Linesmen: Matt MacPherson, Bryan Pancich

Pregame/Anthem/Entertainment
A pre-game performance was conducted by the Jacks, Weezer performed a three-song concert during the first intermission including their hit cover of "Africa" by Toto, and Judah & the Lion performed a three-song concert during the second intermission.

During the team introductions, the South Bend Symphony Orchestra performed the Notre Dame Fight Song

The anthem was performed by the Blackhawks' anthem singer Jim Cornelison accompanied by the South Bend Symphony Orchestra

A ceremonial puck drop was done by Notre Dame legend Tim Brown

Prior to team introductions the Bruins' and Blackhawks' legends were introduced. For the Bruins, Cam Neely, Johnny Bucyk, and Ray Bourque. For the Blackhawks, Denis Savard, Tony Esposito, Jill Mikita, and Bobby Hull.

Broadcasting
NBC broadcast the game as it has done since the event's inception. Like the previous two Winter Classics, Sportsnet simulcast the NBC feed in Canada, while TVA Sports used NBC's video to dub their French-language commentary.

The game was simulcast on NBC Sports Radio; it was the last program carried on the network before it converted to a part-time syndication service that day.

Ratings
Viewership for the 2019 Winter Classic jumped 20% over the previous season, rising to a 1.94 overnight rating and 2.97 million overall viewers, recovering three years of viewership declines.

References

Further reading
 

NHL Winter Classic
Winter Classic
NHL Winter Classic
NHL Winter Classic
Ice hockey competitions in Indiana
Sports in South Bend, Indiana
Boston Bruins games
Chicago Blackhawks games